Kharoshthi is a Unicode block containing characters used to write the Gandhari and Sanskrit languages in northwest India from the 3rd century BCE to the 4th century CE.

History
The following Unicode-related documents record the purpose and process of defining specific characters in the Kharoshthi block:

References 

Unicode blocks